Tino Schirinzi (12 August 1934 – 18 August 1993), was an Italian actor and stage director.

Born in Taranto, Schirinzi graduated in medicine, then he devoted himself to the theatre, often working at the Teatro Stabile in Turin and at the Piccolo Teatro in Milan.  He created a successful artistic partnership with Piera Degli Esposti, and took part in Italian theatrical debut of Patrice Chéreau. After 1968, he was author of irreverent reinterpretations of works by Gabriele d'Annunzio, Carlo Goldoni and of the Elizabethan theatre which resulted in a resounding firing from the Vittoriale theatre.

Less active in cinema,  in 1983 Schirinzi won a Nastro d'Argento for Best Supporting Actor thanks to his performance in  Sciopèn.

Struck by an incurable cancer, for which he had lost his speech, in 1993 he killed himself with his wife Daisy Lumini, by jumping from the viaduct under construction on the Bilancino dam near Barberino di Mugello.

Filmography

References

External links 
  

1934 births
People from Taranto
1993 deaths
Italian male stage actors
Nastro d'Argento winners
Suicides by jumping in Italy
20th-century Italian male actors
Italian male film actors
1993 suicides
Joint suicides